Copenhagen North Business College, also known as Lnord (formerly København Nord), is an institution of secondary education in the northern part of Greater Copenhagen, Denmark. It operates three campuses in Kongens Lyngby, Hillerød and Frederikssund and offers educational programmes in business and management on a secondary level to post-primary youth, Higher Commercial Examination Programme (HHX), and supplementary courses for adults seeking to maintain qualifications.

Knord is an independent self-owning institution under the Danish state, managed by a board composed of members from the business community in conjunction with a CEO and rectors of the individual schools that oversees day-to-day operations.

History
København Nord was established on 1 January 2005 through the merger of  Hillerød Handelsskole and Lyngby Uddannelsescenter Institutionen. On 1 August 2016, ts name was officially changed from København Nord to Knord.

Campuses

Knord Lyngby
Knord has a total of around 1,600 students in Lyngby. The Lyngby campus comprises Lyngby Business College as well as the high school Lyngby Gymnasium.

Knord Hillerød
Knord Hillerød was established on 1. January 2000. >The campus is located at Trollesmindeallé 24. Gillerød Business College has around 700 students.

Knord Frederikssund
Knord has around 350 students in Frederikssund.

References

External links
 Official website

Secondary schools in Copenhagen
Educational institutions established in 2005
2005 establishments in Denmark
Hillerød Municipality
Frederikssund Municipality
Education in Lyngby-Taarbæk Municipality